Creed: Rise to Glory is a virtual reality boxing video game. It was released in 2018, by Survios. The game is based on the Rocky franchise. The game is compatible with both HTC Vive and Oculus Rift for Microsoft Windows, the Oculus Quest and with the PlayStation VR for PlayStation 4. An updated version titled Creed: Rise to Glory – Championship Edition is set to release April 4, 2023 on the PlayStation VR2 for PlayStation 5.

Gameplay

Multiplayer 
Multiplayer is included in the game in the way of PVP. Players can have a quick match or fight specific friends.

Career 
The Career Mode has the player train for a fight and progress through multiple fights as Rocky Balboa helps along the way.

Reception

Critical response

The game was met with positive reception upon release. GameRankings and Metacritic gave it a score of 86.67% and 84 out of 100 for the PC version, and 74.79% and 73 out of 100 for the PlayStation 4 version.

References

External links 
 
 

2018 video games
Rocky (film series) video games
Survios games
Video games developed in the United States
Windows games
PlayStation 4 games
PlayStation VR games
Oculus Rift games
Meta Quest games
HTC Vive games